Seo Chun-oh (born 3 August 1967) is a South Korean rugby sevens coach. He coached the South Korean sevens team at the 2020 Summer Olympics in Japan.

He played as a centre for South Korea in the mid-1980s. In 2019, he helped South Korea secure a spot in the Tokyo Summer Olympics.

References

External links 

 Seo Chun-oh at Olympedia

1967 births
Living people
Coaches of international rugby sevens teams
South Korea national rugby sevens team coaches